Indirect presidential elections were held in Brazil on 11 April 1964 shortly after the U.S.-backed March coup carried out by the Brazilian military. Humberto de Alencar Castelo Branco was elected President by the National Congress, receiving 361 of the 366 votes cast. José Maria Alkmin was elected Vice-President unopposed after Auro de Moura Andrade withdrew his candidacy.

Background 
Following the events of the coup in the same year, João Goulart, the president, was deposed by allegations of leaving the country with no permission. Since João Goulart was already the Vice President, the President of the Chamber of Deputies, Ranieri Mazzili, assumed the post until a new president to be elected until 1965 (the end of João Goulart term) by the National Congress of Brazil. The date of election, was scheduled by the first Institutional Act, amended by the Supreme Command of the Revolution, the de facto ruler over Brazil at that moment.

The Social Democratic Party, now as an opposition party in parliament, like the National Democratic Union, agreed to elect Castelo Branco as president. Castelo Branco  promised to preserve the Brazilian Democracy and fight against corruption and the crisis in the country. A new civil vice-president was elected on the same day.

Results

President
The election was virtually a single-runner election; some parliamentarians voted for Juarez Távora, as a protest vote

Vice President
None of the candidates for Vice-President achieved the required absolute majority of votes in the first round. José Maria Alkmin received 203 votes; Auro de Moura Andrade received 150 votes; Ranieri Mazzilli received 2 votes; Milton Campos received 2 votes; Antonio Sanchez Galdeano received 1 vote; and there were 63 abstentions. For the second round of voting, Moura Andrade withdrew his candidacy, and Alkmin was elected with 256 of the 268 votes cast.

References

President
Presidential elections in Brazil
Brazil
Preasidential
Brazil